Dziewulski may refer to:
 Dziewulski (crater), a lunar crater
 Dziewulski (surname), a Polish surname

See also